Audio-Visualscapes is an album by Jack DeJohnette's Special Edition, featuring Greg Osby, Gary Thomas, Mick Goodrick, and Lonnie Plaxico, recorded in 1988 and released on the MCA/Impulse! label. The Allmusic review by Scott Yanow states, "This single-CD (formerly a double-LP) from Jack DeJohnette's Special Edition contains music that mixes together advanced hard bop, fusion, M-Base funk and avant-garde jazz... The results are sometimes unsettling but rarely dull, well worth several listens".

Track listing 
All compositions by Jack DeJohnette except as indicated

Side one 
 "PM's AM" - 5:50
 "Donjo" (Greg Osby) - 6:20
 "Master Mind" (Osby) - 8:07

Side two 
 "Slam Tango" - 6:06
 "The Sphinx" (Ornette Coleman) - 15:22

Side three 
 "One For Eric" - 12:10
 "Brown, Warm & Wintery" - 5:45

Side four 
 "Audio-Visualscapes" (DeJohnette, Lonnie Plaxico, Osby, Mick Goodrick, Gary Thomas) - 14:25
 Recorded at Grog Kill, Woodstock NY on February 1–3, 1988

Personnel 
 Jack DeJohnette – drums, electronic keyboards
 Gary Thomas – tenor saxophone, flute, bass clarinet
 Greg Osby – alto saxophone, soprano saxophone
 Lonnie Plaxico – electric bass, acoustic bass
 Mick Goodrick – electric guitar

References 

Jack DeJohnette albums
1988 albums
MCA Records albums
Impulse! Records albums